Paleolinguistics is a term used by some linguists for the study of the distant human past by linguistic means. For most historical linguists there is no separate field of paleolinguistics. Those who use the term are generally advocates of hypotheses not generally accepted by mainstream historical linguists, a group colloquially referred to as "long-rangers".

Background 
The controversial hypotheses in question fall into two categories. Some of them involve the application of standard historical linguistic methodology in ways that raise doubts as to the validity of the hypothesis. A good example of this sort is the Moscow school of Nostraticists, founded by Vladislav Illich-Svitych and including Aharon Dolgopolsky,  Sergei Starostin, and Vitaly Shevoroshkin, who have argued for the existence of  Nostratic, a language family including the Indo-European, Afro-Asiatic, Altaic, Dravidian, and Kartvelian language families and sometimes other languages. They have established regular phonological correspondences, observed morphological similarities, and reconstructed a proto-language in accordance with the accepted methodology. Nostratic is not generally accepted, in part because critics have doubts about the accuracy of the correspondences and reconstruction.

Other hypotheses are controversial because the methods used to support them are considered by mainstream historical linguists to be invalid in principle. Into that category fall proposals based on mass comparison, a technique in which relationships are postulated on basis of sets of words resembling each other in sound and meaning, without establishing phonological correspondences or carrying out a reconstruction.

Prominent examples are the work of Joseph Greenberg and Merritt Ruhlen. Most linguists reject that method as unable to distinguish similarities from common ancestry from those from borrowing or chance.

Paleolinguists 
Other linguists who may be considered paleolinguists due to their advocacy of long-range hypotheses include: 
John Bengtson, Knut Bergsland, Derek Bickerton, Václav Blažek, Robert Caldwell, Matthias Castrén, Björn Collinder, Albert Cuny, Igor Diakonov, Vladimir Dybo, Harold Fleming, Eugene Helimski, Otto Jespersen, Frederik Kortlandt, Samuel E. Martin, Roy Andrew Miller, Hermann Möller, Susumu Ōno, Holger Pedersen, Alexis Manaster Ramer, G.J. Ramstedt, Rasmus Rask, Jochem Schindler, Wilhelm Schmidt, Georgiy Starostin, Morris Swadesh, Henry Sweet, Vilhelm Thomsen, Vladimir N. Toporov, Alfredo Trombetti, and C.C. Uhlenbeck.

An entirely different point of view underlies Mario Alinei's Paleolithic continuity theory, which is based on the doctrine of polygenism rather than that of monogenesis.

Applications 
Many recent interdisciplinary research papers use paleolinguistics as one of their approaches. For example, evolutionary biologist Mark Pagel has written an article titled  Ultraconserved words point to deep language ancestry across Eurasia that combines advanced novel statistical modeling techniques and computational methods with paleolinguistic arguments to give theoretical justification to the search for features of language that might be preserved across wide spans of time and geography. Another  recent interdisciplinary paper, titled Ancestral Dravidian languages in Indus Civilization: ultraconserved Dravidian tooth-word reveals deep linguistic ancestry and supports genetics, written by Bahata Ansumali Mukhopadhyay, combines archaeological, archaeogenetic, historical and paleolinguistic arguments to establish that a significant population of Indus civilization spoke certain ancestral Dravidian languages. Another important research by Asko Parpola and Christian Carpelan combines archaeological and paleolinguistic evidence and argues that the IndoEuropean and Uralic proto-languages were both spoken in archaeological cultures of eastern Europe, and that even the predecessors and some of the successors of these cultures were in contact with each other.

See also
Mass lexical comparison
Moscow School of Comparative Linguistics
Origins of language
Proto-World language
Superfamily (linguistics)

Notes

Sources 
Blažek, V., et al. 2001. Paleolinguistics: The State of the Art and Science (Festschrift for Roger W. Wescott). Mother Tongue 6: 29-94.
 Campbell, Lyle. (1997). American Indian languages: The historical linguistics of Native America. New York: Oxford University Press. .
 
Hegedűs, I., et al. (Ed.) 1997. Indo-European, Nostratic, and Beyond (Festschrift for Vitalij V. Shevoroshkin). Washington, DC: Institute for the Study of Man.
 Hock, Hans Henrich & Joseph, Brian D. (1996). Language History, Language Change, and Language Relationship: An Introduction to Historical and Comparative Linguistics. Berlin: Mouton de Gruyter.
 
Matisoff, James. (1990) On Megalocomparison. Language, 66. 109-20
 Poser, William J. and Lyle Campbell (1992). Indo-european practice and historical methodology, Proceedings of the Eighteenth Annual Meeting of the Berkeley Linguistics Society, pp. 214–236.
Renfrew, Colin, and Daniel Nettle. (Ed.) 1999. Nostratic: Examining a Linguistic Macrofamily. Cambridge, UK: McDonald Institute for Archaeological Research.
Ringe, Donald. (1992). "On calculating the factor of chance in language comparison". American Philosophical Society, Transactions, 82 (1), 1-110.
Ruhlen, Merritt. 1994. The Origin of Language: Tracing the Evolution of the Mother Tongue. New York: John Wiley & Sons.
Shevoroshkin, V. (Ed.) 1992. Nostratic, Dene-Caucasian, Austric and Amerind.  Bochum: Brockmeyer.  
Swadesh, Morris. 1971. The Origin and Diversification of Language. Ed. by Joel Sherzer. Chicago/New York: Aldine Atherton.

External links
How likely are chance resemblances among languages?
Association for the Study of Language in Prehistory
Santa Fe Institute, Evolution of Human Language Project

 
Historical linguistics